MenaJet Lebanon s.a.l. was a Lebanese charter airline based in Beirut, Lebanon. It operates services to Turkey, Egypt and around the Mediterranean. Its main bases were Beirut Rafic Hariri International Airport and Sharjah International Airport. In 2010, the airline ceased all operations.

History 
The airline was established in May 2003 and started operations on 13 August 2004. It is owned by Al Zamil Group (45%), Gulf Finance House (45%) and others (10%) and has 47 employees (at March 2007). The airline was initially planning to operate as a low-cost carrier, however it had since shifted its strategy and is focusing on charter operations. So far, the venture has been successful. 

The airline ceased operations in 2008.

Destinations 
MenaJet's schedule is constantly changing as they are a charter carrier. In the summer, they operate to a number of destinations for vacation package companies, namely Nakhal. Throughout the rest of the year, MenaJet's traffic mostly relies on wet-leases and non-scheduled charters.  MenaJet offers flights to Berlin, Amsterdam, Egypt, and Turkey.

Fleet
The MenaJet fleet consisted of the following aircraft (as of March 2009):

1 Airbus A320-211

References

External links
MenaJet
MenaJet Fleet
 Menajet Pic
MenaJet Info

Defunct airlines of Lebanon
Airlines established in 2003
Airlines disestablished in 2010
2003 establishments in Lebanon